Identity cleansing is defined as "confiscation of personal identification, passports, and other such documents in order to make it difficult or impossible for those driven out to return".

Kosovo War
 
Expelled Kosovar Albanians were systematically stripped of identity and property documents including passports, land titles, automobile license plates, identity cards and other documents. In conjunction with the policy of expelling ethnic Albanians from the province, the Yugoslav forces would confiscate all documents that indicated the identity of those being expelled. 
Physicians for Human Rights reports that nearly 60 percent of respondents to its survey observed Yugoslav forces removing or destroying personal identification documents. Human Rights Watch also documented the common practice of "identity cleansing": refugees expelled toward Albania were frequently stripped of their identity documents and forced to remove the license plates from their vehicles. This criminal practice suggesting the government was trying to block their return.

In addition to confiscating the relevant documents from their holders, efforts were also made to destroy any actual birth records (and other archives) which were maintained by governmental agencies, so as to make the "cleansing" complete (this latter tactic sometimes being referred to as "archival cleansing").

This practice received worldwide condemnation, and evidence of it has been brought at the war crimes trials held at The Hague after the situation in Kosovo was stabilized following the NATO bombing of FR Yugoslavia and the subsequent collapse of its nationalist government. Despite difficulties due to "identity cleansing", UNMIK and Organization for Security and Co-operation in Europe registered 1.3 million voters until the October 2002 municipal elections.

See also 
 Ethnic cleansing
 List of massacres in the Kosovo War

References

Crimes
Kosovo War
Ethnic cleansing in Europe
Serbian war crimes in the Kosovo War
Legal history of Serbia
Law enforcement in Serbia
Human rights abuses
Identity documents
Public records
Refugees
Deportation